The 1960 Liberty Bowl was a college football postseason bowl game played on December 17, 1960. The second edition of the Liberty Bowl, the game featured the Penn State Nittany Lions and the Oregon Webfoots, both independent programs.

Background
Penn State was making their second straight Liberty Bowl appearance, while Oregon was appearing in a bowl game after a two-year absence. 30 degree weather with three feet snowbanks made for a cold field.

Game summary
Oregon – Dave Grosz 1 run (kick failed), 5:40, 1st
Penn State – Don Jonas 1 run (Henry Opperman kick), 12:50, 2nd
Penn State – Al Gursky 2 run (Opperman kick), 2:25, 2nd
Penn State – Dick Hoak 6 run (Opperman kick), :41, 2nd
Oregon – Dave Grayson 10 run (pass failed), 5:31, 3rd
Penn State – Ed Caye 1 run (Opperman kick), 9:03, 4th
Penn State – Hoak 11 run (kick failed), 7:14, 4th
Penn State – Dick Pae 33 pass from Hoak (Jonas kick), 5:14, 4th

Hoak rushed for 61 yards on 9 carries for two touchdowns with 67 yards passing in route to being named MVP. Oregon's Dave Grayson ran for 93 yards on 10 carries

Aftermath
Oregon has not returned to the Liberty Bowl since this game while Penn State has returned just once, in 1979.

Statistics

References

Liberty Bowl
Liberty Bowl
Penn State Nittany Lions football bowl games
Oregon Ducks football bowl games
Liberty Bowl
December 1960 sports events in the United States